Dongye may refer to:

Eastern Ye, chiefdom in northeastern Korean peninsula from roughly 3rd-century BC to around early 5th-century AD

Towns in China
Dongye, Wutai County, Shanxi
Dongye, Yangcheng County, Shanxi
Dongye, Xinjiang, in Shawan County, Xinjiang